Alexander Fyodorovich Bolomozhnov (born January 2, 1962) is a Soviet and Russian football player, defender. 

In 1993, he played 21 Top League matches and one game in the Kazakhstan Cup for FC BGS (Aksay).

Notes

References

1962 births
Living people
Soviet footballers
Russian footballers
Association football defenders
Expatriate footballers in Kazakhstan
Russian expatriate sportspeople in Kazakhstan
Kazakhstan Premier League players